Korean-style socialism may refer to:

 Socialism in South Korea
 Socialism of Our Style (North Korea)